Livingstonite is a mercury antimony sulfosalt mineral. It occurs in low-temperature hydrothermal veins associated with cinnabar, stibnite, sulfur and gypsum.

It was first described in 1874 for an occurrence in Huitzuco de los Figueroa,  Guerrero, Mexico. It was named to honor Scottish explorer of Africa, David Livingstone.

Its crystal structure was determined in 1957 and redetermined in 1975.

References

 Palache, C., H. Berman, and C. Frondel (1944) Dana’s system of mineralogy, (7th edition), v. I, 485–486

Mercury(II) minerals
Sulfosalt minerals
Monoclinic minerals
Minerals in space group 15